William III (c. 1186 c. 1198), a scion of the Hauteville dynasty, was the last Norman King of Sicily, who reigned briefly for ten months in 1194. He was overthrown by his great-aunt Constance and her husband Emperor Henry VI.

Life and reign 
William was the second son of Count Tancred of Lecce and his wife Sibylla of Acerra. When in 1189 King William II of Sicily died childless, Tancred, an illegitimate son of the Norman duke Roger III of Apulia gained the support of Pope Clement III to be crowned King of Sicily, denying the rights of his aunt Constance, daughter of late King Roger II.

At the age of four, shortly after the death of his older brother Roger, William had been crowned co-ruler by his father, Tancred, in Palermo. His father died on 20 February 1194, while his mother, Sibylla, acted as his regent.

However, Constance's husband, the Hohenstaufen emperor Henry VI claimed the throne of Sicily in right of his wife. Even before Tancred's death he had been laying plans to invade, and his resources had been further augmented by the ransom he had received for the release of King Richard I of England.

Overthrow and death 

In August 1194 Henry marched against Sicily. Sibylla was unable to organize much effective resistance. By the end of October Henry had conquered all the mainland parts of the kingdom and crossed over into the island of Sicily. On 20 November Palermo fell, William and his mother fled to Caltabellotta Castle.

Henry offered Sibylla generous terms: William was to retain the County of Lecce, the home territory of his father before he had become king, and was also to retain the Principality of Taranto in turn for renouncing the royal crown. With that agreement reached, William, his mother and his sisters watched while Henry was crowned King of Sicily on 25 December. Nevertheless, four days later, an alleged conspiracy against the new king was uncovered, and many of the leading Italo-Norman political figures were arrested and sent to prison in Germany, including William and his family.

While his mother and sisters were eventually released and lived in obscurity in France, nothing is known for certain of William's subsequent fate. He is said to have been blinded and castrated, on orders of Henry. According to some sources he died in captivity at Hohenems Castle a few years later. Another theory is that he later returned to Sicily under the alias Tancredi Palamara. Henry's son, Emperor Frederick II (who was also king of Sicily) discovered Tancredi Palamara in Messina and had him executed in 1232. However, referring to several letters by Pope Celestine III, the date generally accepted for his death is 1198. William's heir was his younger sister, whose precise name is unclear but has been given variously as Mary, Elvira, Albinia or Blanche.

Notes

References

Sources

1190 births
1198 deaths
12th-century Kings of Sicily
Monarchs deposed as children
Medieval child monarchs
Italo-Normans
Sicilian people of Norman descent
Counts of Lecce
Nobility from Palermo
Dethroned monarchs